Leah Turner (born July 29, 1987) is an American country music singer who was previously signed with Columbia Nashville.

Early life and education 
Turner was born on July 29, 1987, in California. She was raised on a ranch with horses, goats, and chickens in Morongo Valley, California. Turner attended the University of California, Santa Barbara and took music and songwriting classes. While at UCSB, she sang in front of Kenny Loggins who convinced her to move to Los Angeles, California to pursue her career.

Career 
Turner took Kenny Loggins' advice and moved to Los Angeles to pursue a singing career.  She worked with Humberto Gatica and David Foster, but moved to Nashville, Tennessee to pursue a country career.

Turner was signed to Columbia Nashville in July 2013. Her debut single, "Take the Keys," was co-written with Cary Barlowe and Jesse Frasure and released on October 7, 2013. The song debuted at number 60 on the Billboard Country Airplay chart dated for the week ending October 19, 2013, and peaked at number 37 while spending 23 weeks total listed. Her second single, "Pull Me Back," spent one week on the Billboard Country Airplay chart at number 52.

Discography

Extended plays

Singles

Music videos

References

External links 
 

1987 births
Living people
People from Morongo Valley, California
Singer-songwriters from California
American women country singers
American country singer-songwriters
University of California, Santa Barbara alumni
Columbia Records artists
21st-century American singers
21st-century American women singers
Country musicians from California
Country musicians from Tennessee
Singer-songwriters from Tennessee